Sopore Assembly constituency is one of the 87 constituencies in the Jammu and Kashmir Legislative Assembly of Jammu and Kashmir a north state of India. Sopore is also part of Baramulla Lok Sabha constituency.

Member of Legislative Assembly

 1962: Abdul Ghani Malik, Jammu & Kashmir National Conference
 1967: Gulam Nabi Mircha, Indian National Congress
 1972: Syed Ali Shah Gilani, Jamaat-e-Islami Kashmir
 1977: Syed Ali Shah Gilani, Jamaat-e-Islami Kashmir
 1983: Hakim Habibullah, Jammu & Kashmir National Conference
 1987: Syed Ali Shah Gilani, Independent
 1996: Haji Abdul Ahad Vakil, Jammu & Kashmir National Conference
 2002: Abdul Rashid, Indian National Congress
 2008: Mohammad Ashraf Ganie, Jammu & Kashmir National Conference

Election results

2014

See also
 Sopore
 Baramulla district
 List of constituencies of Jammu and Kashmir Legislative Assembly

References

Assembly constituencies of Jammu and Kashmir
Baramulla district
Sopore